The RKA Mission Control Centre, also known by its acronym TsUP (ЦУП) or by its radio callsign Mission Control Moscow, is the mission control centre of Roscosmos. It is located in Korolyov, Moscow Oblast, in Pionerskaya Street near the S.P. Korolev Rocket and Space Corporation Energia plant.

It contains an active control room for the International Space Station. It also houses a memorial control room for the Mir space station where the last few orbits of Mir before it burned up in the atmosphere are shown on the display screens.

TsUP provides practical flight control for spacecraft of several different classes: manned orbital complexes, spaceships, space probes and civilian, and scientific satellites. At the same time, it carries out scientific and engineering research and development of methods, algorithms, and tools for control problems, ballistics, and navigation.

Notes

References

External links

Science and technology in Russia
Space program of Russia
Roscosmos
Soviet and Russian space program locations